Parafilimonas rhizosphaerae is a Gram-negative, aerobic and rod-shaped bacterium from the genus of Parafilimonas which has been isolated from the rhizosphere of a tomato plant from Buyeo-gun in Korea.

References

External links
Type strain of Parafilimonas rhizosphaerae at BacDive -  the Bacterial Diversity Metadatabase

Chitinophagia
Bacteria described in 2017